Conwy, previously known in English as Conway, is a walled market town, community and the administrative centre of Conwy County Borough in North Wales. The walled town and castle stand on the west bank of the River Conwy, facing Deganwy on the east bank. The town formerly lay in Gwynedd and prior to that in Caernarfonshire. The community, which also includes Deganwy and Llandudno Junction, had a population of 14,753 at the 2011 census.

Although the community of Conwy straddles the River Conwy, for postal purposes the areas on the east bank form part of the post town of Llandudno Junction, with the Conwy post town being confined to west bank of the river. The ward on the west bank of the river had a population of 4,065 at the 2011 census.

The resident population of the wider Conwy County Borough was estimated to be 116,200 in an ONS-estimate.

The name 'Conwy' derives from the old Welsh words cyn (chief) and gwy (water), the river being originally called the 'Cynwy'.

History

Castle and town walls
 
Conwy Castle and the town walls were built, on the instructions of Edward I of England, between 1283 and 1289, as part of his conquest of the principality of Wales. The church standing in Conwy has been marked as the oldest building in Conwy and has stood in the walls of Conwy since the 14th century. However, the oldest structure is part of the town walls, at the southern end of the east side. Here one wall and the tower of a llys (palace/court house) belonging to Llywelyn the Great and his grandson Llywelyn ap Gruffydd have been incorporated into the wall. Built on a rocky outcrop, it has a prominent apsidal tower.

The walls are part of a World Heritage Site, Castles and Town Walls of King Edward in Gwynedd.

People born within the town walls of Conwy are nicknamed "Jackdaws", after the jackdaws which live on the walls there. A Jackdaw Society existed until 2011.

The population of the town in 1841 was 1,358.

Abbey
Conwy was the original site of Aberconwy Abbey, founded by Llywelyn the Great. Edward and his troops took over the abbey site and moved the monks up the Conwy valley to a new site at Maenan, establishing Maenan Abbey. The parish church St Mary & All Saints still retains some parts of the original abbey church in the east and west walls.

Suspension bridge
Conwy has other tourist attractions. Conwy Suspension Bridge, designed by Thomas Telford to replace the ferry, was completed in 1826 and spans the River Conwy next to the castle. Telford designed the bridge's supporting towers to match the castle's turrets. The bridge is now open to pedestrians only and, together with the toll-keeper's house, is in the care of the National Trust.

Railway bridge
The Conwy Railway Bridge, a tubular bridge, was built for the Chester and Holyhead Railway by Robert Stephenson. The first tube was completed in 1848, the second in 1849. The bridge is still in use on the North Wales Coast Line, along with the station, which is located within the town walls. In addition to a modern bridge serving the town, the A55 road passes under the river in a tunnel, Britain's first immersed tube tunnel, which was built between 1986 and 1991. The old mountain road to Dwygyfylchi and Penmaenmawr runs through the Sychnant Pass, at the foot of Conwy Mountain.

Aberconwy House
The National Trust owns Aberconwy House, which is Conwy's only surviving 14th-century merchant's house, one of the first buildings built inside the walls of Conwy.

Plas Mawr 

Plas Mawr is an Elizabethan house built in 1576 by the Wynn family, which has been extensively refurbished to its 16th-century appearance and is now in the care of Cadw and open to the public.

Smallest house in Great Britain

The house named in the Guinness Book of Records as the Smallest House in Great Britain, with dimensions of 3.05 × 1.8 metres, can be found on the quay. It was in continuous occupation from the 16th century (and was even inhabited by a family at one point) until 1900 when the owner (a  fisherman – Robert Jones) was forced to move out on the grounds of hygiene. The rooms were too small for him to stand up in fully. The house is still owned by his descendants today, and visitors can look around it for a small charge.

Vardre Hall 
Vardre Hall is a 19th-century Grade II listed building directly opposite to Conwy Castle. It was erected by Conservative Buckinghamshire MP William Edward FitzMaurice in the mid 1850s. In 1869 the building was sold to solicitor William Jones. The building was used as a solicitor's office until 1972, when it was bought out and became The Towers Restaurant. After lying empty for a number of years Vardre Hall changed hands again, and in 1999 was refurbished as a shop.

Medieval watchtower
Across the estuary is Bodysgallen Hall, which incorporates a medieval tower that was possibly built as a watch tower for Conwy Castle.

Notable locations
Conwy Morfa, a marshy spit of land on the west side of the estuary, was probably the location where golf was first played on Welsh soil. It was also the place where Hugh Iorys Hughes developed, and later built, the floating Mulberry Harbour, used in Operation Overlord in World War II.

Conwy Hospital closed in 2003 and has since been demolished.

Conwy railway station opened in 1848.

Lifeboat
A lifeboat station was established by the RNLI in 1966 and currently operates the D-class inshore lifeboat, the May-Bob, (D–765).

Governance

A Conwy electoral ward exists for elections to Conwy County Borough Council. The ward extends west of the River Conwy only with a total population of 4,065. The other county wards within the Conwy community are Deganwy, Marl and Pensarn.

Conwy also has a town council, based at Conwy Guildhall, comprising 17 town councillors elected from the five community wards of Aberconwy, Castle, Deganwy, Marl and Pensarn.

Administrative history
Conwy was an ancient borough. Unlike most such boroughs, it was not reformed by the Municipal Corporations Act 1835, and so the old borough corporation continued to exist and run the town. By 1876 the borough corporation was seen as an archaic and unaccountable impediment to the proper management of the town. The town's residents organised a petition to convert the town into a municipal borough with an elected corporation to take responsibility for public health and local government. A royal charter incorporating the town as a municipal borough was issued in December 1876, and the new borough corporation took over the running of the town from March 1877. The municipal borough boundary included land on both sides of the river, covering the parish of Conwy (or Conway) and parts of the parishes of Gyffin and Dwygyfylchi on the west bank, and part of the parish of Eglwys Rhos on the east bank. The urban parishes within the borough boundary were reorganised in 1894 to comprise Conwy and Gyffin on the west bank and Llanrhos on the east bank.

In 1972 the borough council voted to change the spelling of the town's name from "Conway" to "Conwy". The change was agreed by the Secretary of State for Wales and took effect on 1 August 1972. The municipal borough was abolished in 1974, with the area becoming part of the Aberconwy district in the new county of Gwynedd. A community called Conwy was established at the same time covering the area of the former borough. Further local government reorganisation in 1996 saw Aberconwy abolished and the town transferred to the new Conwy County Borough, named after the town but covering a much larger area.

Gallery
Images showing changes over time

References

External links

 A Vision of Britain Through Time
 British Listed Buildings
 Conwy River Festival
 Conwy Town Tourism Association
 Genuki
 Geograph
 International Database and Gallery of Structures
 Office for National Statistics
 The Sychnant Pass
 Welcome to Conwy

 
Fortified settlements
Towns in Conwy County Borough